Ortalotrypeta tibeta is a species of tephritid or fruit flies in the genus Ortalotrypeta of the family Tephritidae.

Tachiniscinae